Ömer Aslanoğlu (born 23 May 1988) is a Turkish former swimmer, who specialized in the breaststroke events. He represented his nation Turkey at the 2008 Summer Olympics, and also swam for Galatasaray Sports Club.

Aslanoglu competed as a member of the Turkish squad in the men's 200 m breaststroke at the 2008 Summer Olympics in Beijing. Leading up to the Games, he eclipsed a FINA B-standard entry time of 2:17.85 from the Speedo Turkish Open Senior Championships in Izmir. Swimming in heat one, Aslanoglu raced steadily to fourth place and fifty-first overall with a time of 2:17.93, just a slight 0.08 of a second slower than his entry standard.

References

External links
NBC 2008 Olympics profile

1988 births
Living people
Olympic swimmers of Turkey
Swimmers at the 2008 Summer Olympics
Turkish male breaststroke swimmers
Galatasaray Swimming swimmers
Sportspeople from Trabzon
Swimmers at the 2013 Mediterranean Games
Mediterranean Games competitors for Turkey
20th-century Turkish people
21st-century Turkish people